Kosoř is a municipality and village in Prague-West District in the Central Bohemian Region of the Czech Republic. It has about 900 inhabitants.

References

Villages in Prague-West District